Gioacchino Galeotafiore (born 15 February 2000) is an Italian professional footballer who plays as a centre back for  club Salernitana.

Club career
Formed on Salernitana youth system, Galeotafiore made his first team debut on 5 August 2018 for Coppa Italia against Rezzato. He made his Serie B debut on 13 July 2020 against Cittadella.

On 10 October 2020, he was loaned to Serie C club Foggia.

On 11 August 2021, he was loaned again to Seregno.

References

External links
 
 

2000 births
Living people
Sportspeople from the Province of Avellino
Footballers from Campania
Italian footballers
Association football defenders
Serie B players
Serie C players
U.S. Salernitana 1919 players
Calcio Foggia 1920 players
U.S. 1913 Seregno Calcio players